Rytz may refer to:
David Rytz, Swiss mathematician and teacher
Regula Rytz (born 1962), Swiss sociologist, historian, and politician

See also
Rytz's construction, a classical construction of Euclidean geometry
Ritz

Surnames of Swiss origin